Charles Henry Crownhart (April 16, 1863 – May 2, 1930) was a justice of the Wisconsin Supreme Court.

Biography
Crownhart was born in Fond du Lac County, Wisconsin. He was raised in Pierce County, Wisconsin. Crownhart graduated from the University of Wisconsin Law School in 1889. He died in 1930.

Career
Crownhart practiced law in Ellsworth, Wisconsin before moving to Superior, Wisconsin, where he formed a partnership with fellow future Supreme Court Justice Walter C. Owen. He was District Attorney of Douglas County, Wisconsin from 1901 to 1905 before serving as Chairman of the Republican Party of Wisconsin. While practicing law in Madison, Wisconsin in 1915, he was an unsuccessful candidate for the Wisconsin Supreme Court. He was later appointed to the court in 1922 and was a member until his death. Prior to his appointment, he would often counsel Senator Robert M. La Follette, Sr. on important matters.

References

External links

People from Fond du Lac County, Wisconsin
People from Ellsworth, Wisconsin
Politicians from Superior, Wisconsin
Lawyers from Madison, Wisconsin
Justices of the Wisconsin Supreme Court
Republican Party of Wisconsin chairs
Wisconsin lawyers
University of Wisconsin Law School alumni
1863 births
1930 deaths